SRI International (SRI), originally known as the Stanford Research Institute, is one of the world's largest contract research institutes. SRI, based in Menlo Park, California, was established by the trustees of Stanford University in 1946 as a center of innovation to support economic development in the region. In 1970, SRI formally separated from Stanford University and, in 1977, became known as SRI International. The separation was a belated response to Vietnam war protesters at Stanford University who believed that SRI's Defense Advanced Research Projects Agency (DARPA)-funded work was essentially making the university part of the military–industrial complex. Sarnoff Corporation, a wholly owned subsidiary of SRI since 1988, was fully integrated into SRI in January 2011.

SRI's focus areas include telecommunication, computing, economic development and science and technology policy, education, energy and the environment, engineering systems, pharmaceuticals and health sciences, homeland security and national defense, materials and structures, video processing, computer vision, and robotics. SRI currently employs about 2500 people, and has an alumni association.

SRI has had a chief executive of some form since its establishment. Prior to the split with Stanford University, the position was known as the director; after the split, it is known as the company's president and CEO. SRI has had nine so far, including William F. Talbot (1946–1947), Jesse E. Hobson (1947–1955), E. Finley Carter (1956–1963), Charles Anderson (1968–1979), William F. Miller (1979–1990), James J. Tietjen (1990–1993), William P. Sommers (1993–1998), Curtis Carlson (1998–2014), and most recently, William A. Jeffrey (2014–present). SRI also has had a board of directors since its inception, which has served to both guide and provide opportunities for the organization. The current board of directors includes Marianne Byerwalter (chairman), Charles A. Holloway (vice chairman), Samuel Armacost, Vern Clark, William A. Jeffrey (current SRI president and CEO), Robert L. Joss, Leslie F. Kenne, Henry Kressel, David Liddle, Philip J. Quigley, Wendell Wierenga, and John J. Young, Jr.

Many notable SRI researchers were involved with the Augmentation Research Center. These include Principal Investigator Douglas Engelbart, the developer of the modern GUI; William English, who contributed to the design of Engelbart's computer mouse; Jeff Rulifson, the primary software architect of the NLS; Elizabeth J. Feinler, who ran the Network Information Center; and David Maynard, who would help found Electronic Arts. The Artificial Intelligence Center has also produced many notable alumni, many of whom contributed to Shakey the robot; these include project manager Charles Rosen as well as Nils Nilsson, Bertram Raphael, Richard O. Duda, Peter E. Hart, Richard Fikes and Richard Waldinger. Artificial intelligence researcher Gary Hendrix went on to found Symantec. The CALO project (and its spin-off, Siri) also produced notable names including C. Raymond Perrault and Adam Cheyer.

Several SRI projects produced notable researchers and engineers long before computing was mainstream. William K. MacCurdy developed the Hydra-Cushion freight car for Southern Pacific in 1954; Hewitt Crane and Jerre Noe were instrumental in the development of Electronic Recording Machine, Accounting; Harrison Price helped The Walt Disney Company design Disneyland; James C. Bliss developed the Optacon; and Robert Weitbrecht invented the first telecommunications device for the deaf.

A

B

C

D

E

F

G

H

I

K

L

M

N

P

Q

R

S

T

V

W

X-Z

See also
 List of SRI International spin-offs

References

External links
 SRI International
 SRI Alumni Association

 
Lists of people by company
San Francisco Bay Area-related lists
Stanford University-related lists